Bawina is a Togolese short film directed by Minza Bataba. It was released in 1988 and lasts for 27 minutes. The film centres on an engineer in a rural village.

References

External links
 

1988 films
Togolese films
1988 short films